Thomas Sheppard Farm, also known as Sheppard Mill Farm, is a historic home and farm located near Stokes, Pitt County, North Carolina. The farmhouse was built about 1850, and is a two-story, heavy timber frame dwelling with a one-story shed addition and Greek Revival style design elements.  A one-story kitchen wing constructed about 1930, and was enlarged and joined to the main block about 1950. It features a one-story portico with Doric order columns. Also on the property are the contributing tenant house (c. 1930), stock barn (c. 1930), tobacco barn (c. 1930), hog pen (c. 1930), chicken house (c. 1930), brick well house (c. 1930), and agricultural landscape.

It was listed on the National Register of Historic Places in 2000.

References

Farms on the National Register of Historic Places in North Carolina
Greek Revival houses in North Carolina
Houses completed in 1850
Buildings and structures in Pitt County, North Carolina
National Register of Historic Places in Pitt County, North Carolina